The sapayoa or broad-billed sapayoa (Sapayoa aenigma) is a suboscine passerine found in lowland rainforests in Panama and north-western South America. As the epithet aenigma ("the enigma") implies, its relationships have long been elusive. It is easy to overlook, but appears to be common in a wide range and is not considered threatened by the IUCN.

Taxonomy and systematics
The sapayoa was formally described by the German ornithologist Ernst Hartert in 1903 under the present binomial name Sapayoa aenigma.
It has always been considered a monotypic genus, Sapayoa, and historically regarded as a New World suboscine; in particular, it was assigned to the manakin family (Pipridae). However, the species was listed as incertae sedis (position uncertain) in the Sibley-Ahlquist taxonomy, because
"preliminary DNA-DNA hybridization comparisons ... indicate that this species is either a relative of the Old World Eurylaimidae or a sister group of all other Tyrannida, as suggested by earlier biochemical studies .... In any event, it is not a close relative of manakins or any other recent tyrannoid."

More recent research suggests that it is not a New World suboscine at all, but an Old World suboscine. In 2004, it was shown that the sapayoa is an outlier to the New World suboscines. In an earlier analysis based on nDNA myoglobin intron 2 and GAPDH intron 11 sequence data, the authors found the sapayoa 
"as a deep branch in the group of broadbills and pittas of the Old World tropics."

Accordingly, the sapayoa would be the last surviving New World species of a lineage that evolved in Australia-New Guinea when Gondwana was in the process of splitting apart. The sapayoa's ancestors are hypothesized to have reached South America via the Western Antarctica Peninsula.

Nowadays, the sapoyoa is sometimes placed in the family Eurylaimidae with the broadbills. Others tentatively place the sapayoa in the asity family Philepittidae otherwise found only in Madagascar and sometimes included in the broadbill family.

However, the divergence between the broadbills and the sapayoa found in the 2003 study is only slightly less deep than that between the sapayoa and the pittas. It is even possible, though unlikely, that the present species is actually closer to the pittas than to the broadbills. Consequently, it is now placed in its own monotypic family, Sapayoidae.

Description
The sapayoa is a small, olive-colored bird, somewhat paler below and with a yellowish throat.  Its habitus resembles a bigger, longer-tailed, broader-billed female manakin.  It is rare to uncommon in the forest understory, favoring ravines and small streams. It is usually seen in pairs or mixed-species flocks.  It spends long periods perching, then sallies up to pick fruit or catch insects, on foliage or in mid air, with its flat, wide bill in a way reminiscent of flatbills.

The sapayoa builds a nest suspended from a branch usually above a stream. It is a pear-shaped structure with the larger end at the top and fibres hanging beneath. The entrance is at the side.

Breeding behaviour
Sapayoa was previously believed to be monogamous. However, a study observed sapayoas engaging in cooperative breeding.

Footnotes

References
 Banks, Richard C.; Chesser, R. Terry; Cicero, Carla; Dunn, Jon L.; Kratter, Andrew W.;  Lovette, Irby J.; Rasmussen, Pamela C.; Remsen, J. V. Jr.; Rising, James D.; Stotz, Douglas F. & Winker, Kevin (2008). Forty-ninth supplement to the American Ornithologists' Union Check-list of North American Birds. The Auk 125(3): 758–768.  PDF fulltext
 Chesser, R. Terry (2004). Molecular systematics of New World suboscine birds. Mol. Phylogenet. Evol. 32(1): 11–24.  PDF fulltext
 Fjeldså, Jon; Zuccon, Dario; Irestedt, Martin; Johansson, Ulf S. & Ericson, Per G.P. (2003). Sapayoa aenigma: a New World representative of 'Old World suboscines'. Proc. R. Soc. B 270(Supplement 2): 238–241.  PDF fulltext Electronic supplement
 Irestedt, M.; Ohlson, J.I.; Zuccon, Dario; Källersjö, M. & Ericson, Per G.P. (2006). Nuclear DNA from old collections of avian study skins reveals the evolutionary history of the Old World suboscines (Aves: Passeriformes).  Zool. Scripta 35(6): 567–580.  PDF fulltext
 Kemp, Alan & Sherley, Greg H. (2003). Asities. In: Perrins, Christopher (ed.): Firefly Encyclopedia of Birds p. 421. Firefly Books. 
 Remsen, J. V., Jr.; Cadena, C. D.; Jaramillo, A.; Nores, M.; Pacheco, J. F. Robbins, M. B.; Schulenberg, T. S., Stiles, F. G.; Stotz, D. F.; & Zimmer, K. J. Version (2009). A classification of the bird species of South America. American Ornithologists' Union. HTML full text
 Ridgely, Robert S. & Tudor, Guy (1994). The Birds of South America (Volume 2: The suboscine passerines). University of Texas Press, Austin. 
 Sibley, Charles Gald & Monroe, Burt L. Jr. (1990). Distribution and taxonomy of the birds of the world: A Study in Molecular Evolution. Yale University Press, New Haven, CT.

Further reading

External links
 Don Roberson's Bird Families of the World
 Avibase The World Bird Database
BirdLife Species Factsheet

Birds of Colombia
Birds of the Tumbes-Chocó-Magdalena
Birds described in 1903